The KfW, which together with its subsidiaries DEG, KfW IPEX-Bank and FuB forms the KfW Bankengruppe ("banking group"), is a German state-owned investment and development bank, based in Frankfurt. As of 2014, it is the world's largest national development bank and as of 2018 Germany's third largest bank by balance sheet. Its name originally comes from Kreditanstalt für Wiederaufbau ("Credit Institute for Reconstruction"). It was formed in 1948 after World War II as part of the Marshall Plan.

Governance 
KfW is owned by the Federal Republic of Germany (80 percent) and the States of Germany (20 percent). It is led by a five-member executive board headed by CEO , which in turn reports to a 37member Board of Supervisory Directors. The chair and deputy chair of the Board of Supervisory Directors are the German Federal Ministers of Finance and of Economic Affairs, with the positions alternating annually between them. The chairman as of May 2021 is Robert Habeck, Federal Minister for Economic Affairs and Climate Action.

In 2009, Caisse des Dépots, Cassa Depositi e Prestiti, KfW and European Investment Bank founded the Long-Term Investors Club.

Operations 
KfW banking group covers over 90% of its borrowing needs in the capital markets, mainly through bonds that are guaranteed by the federal government. This allows KfW to raise funds at advantageous conditions. Its exemption from having to pay corporate taxes due to its legal status as a public agency and unremunerated equity provided by its public shareholders allow KfW to provide loans for purposes prescribed by the KfW law at lower rates than commercial banks. KfW is not allowed to compete with commercial banks, but it facilitates their business in areas within its mandate. KfW banking group has three business units with distinct functions, as well as several subsidiaries.

Lending by KfW group's two main business units, accounting for more than 90% of total lending, is in Germany and, to a limited extent, in other European countries. However, its largest subsidiary, KfW IPEX-Bank GmbH, predominantly lends internationally. A smaller subsidiary, the German Investment Corporation (DEG), and one of the group's smaller business units, KfW Development Bank, are exclusively active in the international arena, each within their particular business areas.

Subsidiaries and group units

Housing and environment 
KfW Förderbank (KfW promotional Bank), the largest business unit of the group, committed €47.6 billion in 2014, mostly for housing and environmental protection in Germany. It is especially active in promoting energy-efficient housing for owner-occupied houses as well as for landlords, both for new houses and refurbishments. Its energy efficiency standards for houses (KfW-60 and KfW-40) have become accepted standards in Germany. Concerning environmental protection, it promotes, among others, photovoltaic energy (solar cells) which has in turn received massive indirect subsidies through feed-in tariffs under the Renewable Energy Law of 2000. It also invests in municipal infrastructure such as public transport and sanitation through a sub-unit called KfW Kommunalbank (KfW municipal bank). More recently (since 2006), it has also engaged in education where it provides student loans.

Small and medium enterprises 
KfW Mittelstandsbank (which roughly translates as KfW small and medium enterprises bank), the second largest business unit of the group, provides assistance to German small and medium enterprises (SMEs) including individual entrepreneurs and start-ups. In addition to loans it also provides equity and mezzanine financing. Its financing totaled €20.4 billion in 2015.

KfW has been very active in securitization before this market collapsed during the subprime mortgage crisis. Through securitization it helped commercial banks to transfer risks from their housing and SME portfolios to the capital market. KfW also provides loans to European commercial banks to help them finance SMEs, housing and infrastructure (so-called global loans).

Development aid 
KfW Entwicklungsbank (KfW Development Bank) provides financing to governments, public enterprises and commercial banks engaged in microfinance and SME promotion in developing countries. It does so through loans close to market terms using its own resources ("promotional loans"), soft loans that blend KfW resources with support from the federal government's aid budget ("development loans"), as well as highly subsidized loans and grants, the latter two coming entirely from the federal aid budget. Different country groups are offered different financing conditions depending mainly on their per capita income. All these financing instruments are part of what is officially called development cooperation and is more commonly called "development aid".

In German aid, the work of KfW Development Bank is called "financial cooperation" which is complemented by "technical cooperation" by GIZ and other public agencies. The main sectors of financial cooperation are water supply and sanitation, renewable energy and energy efficiency, as well as the development of the financial sector. KfW Development Bank also works, among other sectors, in health, education, agriculture, forestry, solid waste management. It provided €7.4 billion in loans and grants in 2014.

Export and project finance 
The largest subsidiary of KfW banking group is KfW IPEX-Bank. KfW IPEX-Bank is active in project finance and corporate finance related to German or European exports. It also promotes foreign investments in Germany. Unlike KfW, it competes directly with commercial banks. Therefore, and in response to concerns voiced by the European Commission concerning unfair competition, KfW IPEX-Bank has become legally and financially independent in 2008. KfW IPEX-Bank's main sectors of activity are ports, airports, toll roads, bridges and tunnels, railways, ships, planes, telecommunications, energy, and manufacturing. In 2014 the balance sheet total of KfW IPEX-Bank amounted to €26.3 billion.

Another subsidiary of KfW banking group, the German Investment Corporation (DEG), takes minority equity stakes and provides loans to private companies investing in developing countries. It pursues a business model broadly similar to that of the International Finance Corporation of the World Bank Group. Its main sectors of activity are banking, agro-business, renewable energy, telecommunications and manufacturing. It lent 1.2 billion in 2008.

State shareholding 
On behalf of the German state, KfW holds shares in a variety of corporations, including Deutsche Post, Deutsche Telekom, Commerzbank, Lufthansa, and CureVac.

Advisory services 
In 2013, KfW agreed to help establish a Portuguese financial institution to foster economic growth and boost job creation in the country.

Awards 
The magazine Global Finance rated KfW as the safest bank in the world in its "World's 50 Safest Banks 2014" rating. The rating was based on long-term foreign currency ratings from Fitch Ratings and Standard and Poor's and the long-term bank deposit ratings from Moody's Investors Service.

Controversy 
In September 2008, as investors were scrambling to get their funds out of Lehman Brothers, KfW accidentally wired €320 million ($426 million) to Lehman; Germany's largest circulation newspaper, Bild, called KfW "Germany's Dumbest Bank" at the time. The bank subsequently fired two board members over the transfer.

Due to a glitch in the bank's information technology, KfW again accidentally transferred 7.6 billion euros ($8.2 billion) to four other banks in February 2017 but got the money back, incurring costs of 25,000 euros.

See also

Reconstruction Finance Corporation (United States)
List of development aid agencies

References

External links

Company Profile
World's 50 Safest Banks 2009

Banks of Germany
Companies based in Frankfurt
Banks established in 1948
European investment banks
Government-owned companies of Germany
Public finance of Germany
Government-owned banks
National development banks